"Change" is a song by American singer and songwriter Lana Del Rey from her fifth studio album, Lust for Life, released in 2017. The song was written by Del Rey, Rick Nowels. Kieron Menzies co-produced the song alongside Del Rey and Rick Nowels.

Background 

On June 9, 2017, Del Rey uploaded a video of herself listening to the song on Instagram with the caption "Change" and the location "The End of the World, Venice, LA". Two days later on the June 11, she uploaded two more snippets of the song onto her Instagram account.

The title "Change" was confirmed by copyright infringement claims that certain fans received after uploading the snippets of the song to platforms such as YouTube and SoundCloud. In an interview with BBC Radio 1 on July 12, 2017, Del Rey stated that "Change" was the last song written for Lust for Life.

On July 15, days before the release of Lust for Life, Del Rey posted two more videos of the song on her Instagram profile.

Writing and recording
Del Rey's producer Rick Nowels stated that "Change" was recorded a day before the album had to be completed and sent to the record label. They began recording the song at 8:00 p.m. and by 2:00 a.m. the whole record was finished. With this limited time, the song could only be mainly composed of vocals and piano.

When asked what the song was about in an interview for Swedish magazine Bon, Del Rey explained that it was written about "feeling like you have to change on many different levels. First of all, that something has to change in the world. In the first verse, I sing 'there's something in the wind, I can feel it blowing in', and in the second verse I sing that it’s 'on the wings of a song'. When I express my thoughts about change through lyrics and music, it can be about North Korea launching missiles or whatever, but it can also be directed inwards. So in the second verse I make it personal, when it's about being stable, strong, and secure, and not looking for new discoveries when I don't even have my shit together". Del Rey stated that the four words that make up the chorus: "Honest, capable, beautiful and stable" shape the image of who she wants to become.

On December 26, 2017, Del Rey shared five videos through Instagram that were taken of herself during the writing session of "Change" with Rick Nowels, where she recorded a demo of the song.

Composition and critical reception
"Change" is a stripped back voice and piano ballad with approximately 85 beats per minute, it runs at exactly 5 minutes and 21 seconds, making it one of the longer tracks on the album. E.R. Pulgar of PopCrush called the song "her most powerful and heartbreaking as she attempts to be honest, capable, and beautiful in the face of instability". Meaghan Garvey of Pitchfork called the song the "most stunning and thematically essential" song on the album along with "Get Free".

Live performances
Del Rey performed the song live for the first time at her Lust for Life listening party and performance hosted by Spotify at No Vacancy in Los Angeles, California, on July 20, 2017. She also sang it on July 30 and August 1, 2017, at the House of Blues in San Diego and Anaheim. The song was performed at various other 2017 shows and in 2018, the song was included in the LA to the Moon Tour setlist as the first part of a three-part medley with "Black Beauty" and "Young and Beautiful".

Credits and personnel
Personnel
Lana Del Rey — vocals, songwriting, production
Rick Nowels — songwriting, production, piano, mellotron, celeste, bass
Kieron Menzies — production, mixing, engineering, drums, percussion, keyboards
Adam Ayan — mastering

References

2017 songs
Songs written by Rick Nowels
Songs written by Lana Del Rey
Lana Del Rey songs